Matias Maccelli (born October 14, 2000) is a Finnish-American professional ice hockey left wing who currently plays for the  Arizona Coyotes of the National Hockey League (NHL). Maccelli was drafted in the fourth round, 98th overall, by the Coyotes in the 2019 NHL Entry Draft.

Early life
Maccelli was born to an American-born mother and Finnish father in Turku, Finland. His mother had moved to Finland when she was seven years old. Maccelli is of Italian descent through his maternal great-grandfather who was from Italy.

Career statistics

Regular season and playoffs

International

Awards and honours

References

External links

2000 births
Living people
Arizona Coyotes draft picks
Arizona Coyotes players
Dubuque Fighting Saints players
Finnish ice hockey players
Finnish people of American descent
Finnish people of Italian descent
Finnish ice hockey left wingers
Ilves players
Sportspeople from Turku
Tucson Roadrunners players
Sportspeople of Italian descent